Lawrence Trevor Picachy (7 August 1916 – 30 November 1992), was an Indian Jesuit priest, spiritual guide of Mother Teresa, and later Archbishop of Calcutta (1969 to 1992). He was elevated to the cardinalate in 1976.

Biography
Cardinal Pichachy was born in Darjeeling of Irish Catholic parents who had immigrated to India in 1911. After completing the Higher Secondary Cambridge course at St. Joseph's School in Darjeeling, Picachy entered the Society of Jesus, more commonly known as the Jesuits, in 1934. Novitiate training in St. Stanislaus College (Jharkhand), was followed by Philosophical studies at Sacred Heart College in Shembaganur. After a stint as a teacher in St. Xavier's Collegiate School, Calcutta, he spent four years at St. Mary College (Kurseong) for the Theological studies preparing for the priesthood. Picachy was ordained to the priesthood on 21 November 1947, and served as a professor and rector of St Xavier's (school and college), in Calcutta, from 1950 to 1960, whence he began pastoral work in Basanti.

On 12 July 1962, Picachy was appointed the first Bishop of Jamshedpur by Pope John XXIII. He received his episcopal consecration on the following 9 September from Archbishop James Knox, with Archbishop Pius Kerketta, S.J., and Bishop Augustine Wildermuth, S.J., serving as co-consecrators. Picachy attended the Second Vatican Council from 1962 to 1965, and was promoted to Archbishop of Calcutta on 29 May 1969. He was later named President of the Indian Episcopal Conference in 1976.

Pope Paul VI created him Cardinal Priest of Sacro Cuore di Maria in the consistory of 24 May 1976. Picachy was one of the cardinal electors who participated in the conclaves of August and October 1978, which selected Popes John Paul I and John Paul II respectively. He resigned his post as Archbishop on 5 April 1986, after sixteen years of service.

The Cardinal died in Calcutta, at age 76. He is buried at the Jesuit Dhyanashram cemetery in Thakurpukur, Calcutta.

Writings
  (as Trevor Picachy) A Great Achievement:  Episcopal Silver Jubilee Souvenir of His Grace, Dr. Ferdinand Perier, S.J., D.D., Archbishop of Calcutta, December 21, 1921—December 21, 1946 (Calcutta:  Catholic Association of Bengal, 1946)

External links
Cardinals of the Holy Roman Church
Catholic-Hierarchy

1916 births
1992 deaths
20th-century Indian Jesuits
Indian cardinals
Jesuit cardinals
20th-century Roman Catholic archbishops in India
Participants in the Second Vatican Council
People from Darjeeling
Christian clergy from Kolkata
Cardinals created by Pope Paul VI
Academic staff of the University of Calcutta
Indian people of Irish descent
Roman Catholic archbishops of Calcutta